The Papakanui River is a river of the Auckland Region of New Zealand's North Island. This short wide river forms part of the lower Kaipara Harbour system, adding its waters to the harbour close to the settlement of Tauhoa.

See also
List of rivers of New Zealand

References

Rivers of the Auckland Region
Kaipara Harbour catchment